Ecolo, officially Écologistes Confédérés pour l'organisation de luttes originales, (English: Confederate Ecologists for the Organisation of Original Struggles) is a French-speaking political party in Belgium based on green politics. The party is active in Wallonia, the Brussels-Capital Region, and the German-speaking Community of Belgium.

Ecolo's Flemish equivalent is Groen; the two parties maintain close relations with each other.

Name
Ecolo is officially a backronym for Écologistes Confédérés pour l'organisation de luttes originales "Confederated Ecologists for the Organisation of Original Struggles", but is really just short for écologistes, French for environmentalists.

History

Ecolo was part of the 1999 Verhofstadt I Government, but withdrew from the coalition before the 2003 general election, which saw it lose nearly two thirds of its 14 federal parliamentary seats in the face of a resurgent Socialist Party. The party made quite a comeback, however, in the 2007 general election, though failing to match the peak popularity it had enjoyed in 1999. In the general election of 10 June 2007, the party won eight out of 150 seats in the Chamber of Representatives and two out of the 40 directly elected seats in the Senate.

In the 2010 elections the party again won eight seats in the Chamber of Representatives and two in the Senate.

Electoral results

Chamber of Representatives

Senate

Regional

Brussels Parliament

German-speaking Community Parliament

Walloon Parliament

European Parliament

Elected politicians

Current
European Parliament
Philippe Lamberts

Chamber of Representatives
 2010 – 2014:
 Ronny Balcaen
 Juliette Boulet
 Olivier Deleuze (resigned in 2012; replaced by Lahssaini Fouad)
 Zoé Genot
 Muriel Gerkens
 George Gilkinet
 Eric Jadot
 Thérèse Snoy et d'Oppuers

Brussels-Capital Region Parlement
 2009 – 2014:
 Aziz Albishari
 Dominique Braeckman
 Jean-Claude Defosse
 Céline Delforge
 Anne Dirix
 Anne Herscovici
 Zakia Khattabi 
 Vincent Lurquin
 Alain Maron
 Jacques Morel
 Ahmed Mouhssin
 Marie Nagy
 Yaron Pesztat
 Arnaud Pinxteren
 Barbara Trachte
 Vincent Vanhalewyn

Past
Chamber of Representatives
 1995 – 1999:
 Philippe Dallons
 Olivier Deleuze
 Thierry Detienne
 Mylène Nys (20 April 1999) 
 Martine Schüttringer
 Jean-Pierre Viseur
 1999 – 2003:
 Marie-Thérèse Coenen
 Martine Dardenne
 Vincent Decroly
 Olivier Deleuze → Zoé Genot (14 July 1999)
 Thierry Detienne → Muriel Gerkens (23 July 1999)
 Claudine Drion
 Michèle Gilkinet
 Mirella Minne
 Géraldine Pelzer-Salandra
 Paul Timmermans → Bernard Baille (1 September 2002)
 Jean-Pierre Viseur → Gérard Gobert (10 January 2001)

 2003–2007:
 Zoé Genot 
 Muriel Gerkens
 Gérard Gobert 
 Marie Nagy
 2007–2010:
 Juliette Boulet
 Zoé Genot
 Muriel Gerkens
 Georges Gilkinet 
 Philippe Henry 
 Fouad Lahssaini
 Jean-Marc Nollet
 Thérèse Snoy et d'Oppuers
 
Brussels-Capital Region Parlement
 2004–2009:
 Dominique Braeckman
 Alain Daems
 Céline Delforge
 Christos Doulkeridis
 Josy Dubié
 Paul Galand
 Yaron Pesztat

Important figures
 José Daras
 Josy Dubié
 Isabelle Durant
 Muriel Gerkens
 Evelyne Huytebroeck
 Jacky Morael
 Patrick Dupriez
 Zakia Khattabi
 
 Hélène Ryckmans

See also 

 Green party
 Green politics
 List of environmental organizations

References

Green political parties in Belgium
Francophone political parties in Belgium
European Green Party
Global Greens member parties